Interplanetary may refer to:
Interplanetary space, the space between the planets of the Solar System
Interplanetary spaceflight, travel between planets
The interplanetary medium, the material that exists in interplanetary space
The InterPlanetary File System, a distributed file system

See also
Interplanetary magnetic field
Interplanetary mission
Interplanetary internet
InterPlanetary Network
British Interplanetary Society
Interstellar (disambiguation)
Intergalactic (disambiguation)